This article presents a list of the historical events and publications of Australian literature during 1899.

Books 

 Rolf Boldrewood –  'War to the Knife', or, Tangata Maori
 Guy Boothby
 Doctor Nikola's Experiment
 Love Made Manifest
 The Red Rat's Daughter
 A Sailor's Bride
 Louis de Rougemont – Adventures of Louis De Rougemont, as Told By Himself
 Nat Gould – The Dark Horse
 Ethel Pedley – Dot and the Kangaroo
 Rosa Praed – Madame Izan: A Tourist Story

Short stories 

 Louis Becke – Ridan the Devil and Other Stories
 Rolf Boldrewood – "The Mailman's Yarn: An Ower True Tale"
 Ernest Favenc – "Doomed"
 Lala Fisher 
 By Creek and Gully: Stories and Sketches Mostly of Bush Life, Told in Prose and Rhyme, by Australian Writers in England (edited)
 "His Luck"
 E. W. Hornung – "Larrikin of Diamond Creek"
 Henry Lawson
 "Crime in the Bush"
 "A Double Buggy at Lahey's Creek"
 "The Loaded Dog"
 Steele Rudd
 "Kate's Wedding"
 "The Night We Watched for Wallabies"
 On Our Selection
 "The Summer Old Bob Died"
 Douglas Sladen – "The Inside Station"

Poetry 

 Arthur H. Adams 
 "The Australian"
 Maoriland and Other Verses
 E. J. Brady – The Ways of Many Waters
 Christopher Brennan
 "Rondel"
 "Springtides Lost"
 Victor J. Daley – "The Woods of Dandenong"
 George Essex Evans – "The Lion's Whelps"
 Mary Hannay Foott – "New Country"
 Mary Gilmore – "Sweethearts"
 W. T. Goodge – Hits! Skits! and Jingles!
 James Hebblethwaite 
 "Perdita"
 "Wanderers"
 Henry Lawson – "The Sliprails and the Spur"
 Francis MacNamara – "The Convict's Arrival"
 Jack Mathieu – "That Day at Boiling Downs"
 Dowell O'Reilly – "Sea-Grief"
 A. B. Paterson
 "The City of Dreadful Thirst"
 "Father Riley's Horse"
 "The Lost Leichhardt"
 Roderic Quinn
 The Hidden Tide
 "Stars in the Sea"
 Agnes L. Storrie
Poems

Births 

A list, ordered by date of birth (and, if the date is either unspecified or repeated, ordered alphabetically by surname) of births in 1899 of Australian literary figures, authors of written works or literature-related individuals follows, including year of death.

 17 January – Nevil Shute, novelist (died 1960)
 1 July – Edith Mary England, novelist and poet (died 1979–1981)
 9 August – P. L. Travers, novelist (died 1996)

Unknown date
 Stanley William Keogh, poet and short story writer (died 1989)

Deaths 

A list, ordered by date of death (and, if the date is either unspecified or repeated, ordered alphabetically by surname) of deaths in 1899 of Australian literary figures, authors of written works or literature-related individuals follows, including year of birth.

 9 September – Edward P. Vines, poet (born 1850)

See also 
 1899 in poetry
 List of years in literature
 List of years in Australian literature
 1899 in literature
 1898 in Australian literature
 1899 in Australia
 1900 in Australian literature

References

Literature
Australian literature by year
19th-century Australian literature
1899 in literature